The Doug Sanders Celebrity Classic was a golf tournament on the Champions Tour from 1988 to 1994. It was played in Kingwood, Houston, Texas at the Deerwood Club.

The purse for the 1994 tournament was US$500,000, with $75,000 going to the winner. The tournament was founded in 1988 as the Doug Sanders Kingwood Celebrity Classic.

Winners
Doug Sanders Celebrity Classic
1994 Tom Wargo
1993 Bob Charles

Doug Sanders Kingwood Celebrity Classic
1992 Mike Hill
1991 Mike Hill
1990 Lee Trevino
1989 Homero Blancas
1988 Chi-Chi Rodríguez

Source:

References

Former PGA Tour Champions events
Celebrity competitions
Golf in Houston
Sports competitions in Houston